Andrefrancia is a genus of very small air-breathing land snails, terrestrial pulmonate gastropod mollusks in the subfamily Charopinae of the family Charopidae.

Species
Species within the genus Andrefrancia include:
 
 Andrefrancia alveolus (Gassies, 1881)
 Andrefrancia amoana Pawłowska-Banasiak, 2008
 Andrefrancia angustiumbilicata Pawłowska-Banasiak, 2008
 Andrefrancia bazini (Crosse, 1874)
 Andrefrancia berlierei (Crosse, 1875)
 Andrefrancia blemou Pawłowska-Banasiak, 2008
 Andrefrancia bourailensis (Gassies, 1872)
 Andrefrancia calliope (Crosse, 1869)
 Andrefrancia canaliculata Pawłowska-Banasiak, 2008
 Andrefrancia cockerelli Solem, 1960
 Andrefrancia coerulea Pawłowska-Banasiak, 2008
 Andrefrancia compressa Pawłowska-Banasiak, 2008
 Andrefrancia confinis (Gassies, 1875)
 Andrefrancia costulifera (Pfeiffer, 1854)
 Andrefrancia cressoniana Pawłowska-Banasiak, 2008
 Andrefrancia cryptodon Pawłowska-Banasiak, 2008
 Andrefrancia decreta (Gassies, 1871)
 Andrefrancia densicostata Pawłowska-Banasiak, 2008
 Andrefrancia derbesiana (Crosse, 1875)
 Andrefrancia dispersa (Gassies, 1863)
 Andrefrancia goanna Pawłowska-Banasiak, 2008
 Andrefrancia gwendolinae (Preston, 1907)
 Andrefrancia incipiens Pawłowska-Banasiak, 2008
 Andrefrancia kaala Pawłowska-Banasiak, 2008
 Andrefrancia khedeigneana Pawłowska-Banasiak, 2008
 Andrefrancia kouvneleana Pawłowska-Banasiak, 2008
 Andrefrancia kuenthiana Pawłowska-Banasiak, 2008
 Andrefrancia lifuana (Gude, 1905)
 Andrefrancia mamieana Pawłowska-Banasiak, 2008
 Andrefrancia mandjeliana Pawłowska-Banasiak, 2008
 Andrefrancia melaleucarum (Gassies, 1872)
 Andrefrancia memaoyana Pawłowska-Banasiak, 2008
 Andrefrancia miracidium Pawłowska-Banasiak, 2008
 Andrefrancia noumeensis (Crosse, 1870)
 Andrefrancia ostiolum (Crosse, 1870)
 Andrefrancia perspectiva Pawłowska-Banasiak, 2008
 Andrefrancia pinicola (Pfeiffer, 1854)
 Andrefrancia planispira Pawłowska-Banasiak, 2008
 Andrefrancia quadrilamellata Pawłowska-Banasiak, 2008
 Andrefrancia reducisculpta Pawłowska-Banasiak, 2008
 Andrefrancia rotunda Pawłowska-Banasiak, 2008
 Andrefrancia rusticula (Gassies, 1859)
 Andrefrancia saburra (Gassies, 1874)
 Andrefrancia setosa Pawłowska-Banasiak, 2008
 Andrefrancia subcoacta (Gassies, 1870)
 Andrefrancia tandjiana Pawłowska-Banasiak, 2008
 Andrefrancia taslei (Crosse, 1874)
 Andrefrancia tiabetus Pawłowska-Banasiak, 2008
 Andrefrancia tillieriana Pawłowska-Banasiak, 2008
 Andrefrancia tondeuana Pawłowska-Banasiak, 2008
 Andrefrancia tuberculata Pawłowska-Banasiak, 2008
 Andrefrancia vaoana Pawłowska-Banasiak, 2008
 Andrefrancia vetula (Gassies, 1858)
 Andrefrancia vincentina (Crosse, 1870)
 Andrefrancia webbi Pawłowska-Banasiak, 2008

Species brought into synonymy
 Andrefrancia rhizophorarum (Gassies, 1865): synonym of Andrefrancia vetula (Gassies, 1858) (junior synonym)

References

 Solem A. (1960). New Caledonian non-marine snails collected by T. D. A. Cockerell in 1928. Notulae Naturae. 338: 1-9.

External links
 Pawłowska-Banasiak E. (2008). Andrefrancia Solem, 1960 (Gastropoda: Pulmonata: Charopidae) – a systematic revision. Folia Malacologica. 16(3): 101-195

Charopidae